Nicopolis (born c.150 BC) was a Roman hetaira possibly of Greek origin.

She was likely a former slave from Greece, who earned her fortune as a prostitute. Ernst Badian suggests that Nicopolis was not her real name.

She is foremost known as the lover and benefactor of the young Sulla. She was an indepdentently rich woman by the time Sulla became her lover. They had a long term relationship. After her death, she left him her fortune. Their relationship, and the benefit of her fortune on his career, has often been referred to in the history of Sulla. Her fortune in combination with that of his stepmother, helped Sulla on his way in his political career. 

She is a character The First Man in Rome by Colleen McCullough.

See also 

 Metrobius

References

Bibliography 
Ernst Badian, Lucius Sulla, The Deadly Reformer, Sydney University Press, 1970. 

2nd-century BC Greek women
2nd-century BC Roman women
Hetairai
Ancient Roman courtesans
Sulla